Dan Casey (born 29 October 1997) is an Irish footballer who plays  as a defender for Scottish Premiership club Motherwell.

Career

Youth
Casey spent 4 years with the academy team at Sunderland, after joining in 2013.

Bohemians
On 11 July 2017, Casey returned to Ireland, joining League of Ireland Premier Division side Bohemians.

Cork City
For the 2019 season, Casey moved to Cork City.

Return to Bohemians
After a single season with Cork City, Casey returned to Bohemians on 14 December 2019 ahead of their 2020 season.

Sacramento Republic
On 13 January 2021, Casey signed with second-tier side Sacramento Republic FC who play in the USL Championship. He made his debut on 30 April 2021, starting in a 1–0 win over LA Galaxy II. On 7 September 2022, Casey played alongside fellow Irishman Lee Desmond in defence in the 2022 U.S. Open Cup Final as his side were defeated 3–0 by Orlando City in front of a sold out crowd of over 25,000 at the Exploria Stadium in Florida.

Motherwell 
On 3 February 2023, Casey signed with Scottish Premiership club Motherwell.

Career statistics

References

External links
 Dan Casey at Soccerway

1997 births
Living people
Association football defenders
Association footballers from Dublin (city)
Republic of Ireland association footballers
Sunderland A.F.C. players
Bohemian F.C. players
Cork City F.C. players
Sacramento Republic FC players
Expatriate soccer players in the United States
Irish expatriate sportspeople in England
Irish expatriate sportspeople in the United States
USL Championship players
Expatriate footballers in Scotland
Irish expatriate sportspeople in Scotland
Scottish Professional Football League players
Motherwell F.C. players